Fēngyún (FY) are China's meteorological satellites. Launched since 1988 into polar sun-synchronous and geosynchronous orbit, each three-axis stabilized Fengyun satellite is built by the Shanghai Academy of Spaceflight Technology (SAST) and operated by the China Meteorological Administration (CMA).  To date, China has launched nineteen Fengyun satellites in four classes (FY-1 through FY-4). Fengyun 1 and Fengyun 3 satellites are in polar sun-synchronous orbit while Fengyun 2 and 4 are geosynchronous orbit.

On 11 January 2007 China destroyed one of these satellites (FY-1C, COSPAR 1999-025A) in a test of an anti-satellite missile. According to NASA, the intentional destruction of FY-1C created 2,841 high-velocity debris items, a larger amount of dangerous space junk than any other space mission in history.

Classes

Fengyun 1 
The four satellites of the Fengyun 1 (or FY-1) class were China's first meteorological satellites placed in polar, sun-synchronous orbit. In this orbit, FY-1 satellites orbited the Earth at both a low altitude (approximate 900 km above the Earth's surface), and at a high inclination between 98.8° and 99.2° traversing the North Pole every 14 minutes, giving FY-1-class satellites global meteorological coverage with a rapid revisit time and closer proximity to the clouds they image. FY-1A, launched in September 1988, lasted 39 days until it suffered attitude control problems. FY-1B, launched in September 1990 along with the first two QQW (Qi Qui Weixing) balloon satellites, lasted until late 1992 when its attitude control system also failed. FY-1C, launched in May 1999 along with Shijian-5, also completed its two-year design life operating until January 2004. The last satellite of the class, FY-1D, was launched in May 2002 and operated continuously for nine years until in May 2011 operations were temporarily lost. Despite resuscitation, FY-1D failed on 1 April 2012.

All Fengyun 1 satellites were launched from Taiyuan Satellite Launch Center (TSLC) in Shanxi Province on Long March 4A and 4B rockets and weighed 750 kg, 880 kg, 954 kg, and 954 kg respectively. Aboard each satellite were two multichannel visible and infrared scanning radiometers (MVISR) built by the Shanghai Institute of Technical Physics (SITP) bearing an optical scanner, image processor, radiant cooler, and controller for the radiant cooler. FY-1C and FY-1D satellites also carried on board a high-energy particle detector (HEPD) for study of the space environment, contributing to their increased mass. FY-1 satellites are powered by two deployable solar arrays and internal batteries.

Destruction of FY-1C 

On 11 January 2007, China conducted its first anti-satellite (ASAT) missile test, destroying FY-1C with a kinetic kill vehicle, identified by the United States Defense Intelligence Agency (DIA) as the SC-19, a modified DF-21 ballistic missile with mounted kill vehicle. The shootdown, and the subsequent creation of a record-setting amount of in-orbit debris, drew serious international criticism.

Fengyun 2 
Satellites of the Fengyun 2 class are based on the spin-stabilized Dong Fang Hong 2 platform and are China's first class of meteorological satellites in geostationary orbit. Unlike meteorological satellites in polar orbit (like the FY-1 and FY-3 classes), FY-2 satellites in geostationary orbit remain in a fixed position relative to the Earth 35,000 km above its surface and maintain a constant watch over an assigned area. Unlike polar orbiting satellites which view the same area about twice a day, geostationary satellites can image a location as fast as once a minute and show long term meteorological trends - at the cost of resolution.

Built by the Shanghai Institute of Satellite Engineering and operated by the Chinese Meteorological Administration, FY-2 satellites are 4.5 m tall and are spin-stabilized rotating at 100 rotations per minute. FY-2-class satellites have been marketed for their openly available data whereby any user with a receiver could view FY-2 derived sensory data. Satellites of the Fengyun 2 class have a mass of 1,380 kilograms, use solar cells and batteries for power, and a FG-36 apogee motor jettisoned after attaining orbit.

On 2 April 1994, China attempted to launch the Fengyun 2 from Xichang Satellite Launch Center (XSLC) when, prior to its mating with the Long March 3, a fire caused an explosion destroying the satellite, killing a technician, and injuring 20 others. Officials of the Chinese space agency described the $75 million USD loss of the satellite as a "major setback" to the Chinese space program. Despite this, China launched eight successive Fengyun 2 satellites without incident.

Fengyun 3 
Chinese participation in the monitoring of auroras for scientific and space weather investigation was initiated with the launch of the Fengyun-3D satellite, which carries a wide-field auroral imager.

Satellites

See also 
 China Meteorological Administration
 2007 Chinese anti-satellite missile test
 Yaogan
 Gaofen

References

External links 
 Fēngyún-3 satellite programme

Satellites of China
Weather satellites
Spacecraft launched by Long March rockets
Intentionally destroyed artificial satellites
Satellite collisions
Spacecraft that broke apart in space